Gore Vidal was an American writer and screenwriter who worked in a wide variety of genres.

Non-fiction

Books
 Rocking the Boat (1963)
 Reflections Upon a Sinking Ship (1969)
 Sex, Death and Money (1969) (paperback compilation)
 Homage to Daniel Shays: Collected Essays, 1952–1972 (1972) 
 Matters of Fact and of Fiction (1977)
 Sex is Politics and Vice Versa (1979), limited edition by Sylvester & Orphanos
 Views from a Window Co-Editor (1981)
 The Second American Revolution (1983)
 Vidal In Venice (1985) 
 Armageddon? (1987) (UK only)
 At Home (1988)
 A View From The Diner's Club (1991) (UK only)
 Screening History (1992) 
 Decline and Fall of the American Empire (1992) 
 United States: Essays 1952–1992 (1993)  – National Book Award
 
 Virgin Islands (1997) (UK only)
 The American Presidency (1998) 
 Sexually Speaking: Collected Sex Writings (1999)
 The Last Empire: essays 1992–2000 (2001)  (there is also a much shorter UK edition)
 Perpetual War for Perpetual Peace or How We Came To Be So Hated, Thunder's Mouth Press, 2002, (2002) 
 Dreaming War: Blood for Oil and the Cheney-Bush Junta, Thunder's Mouth Press, (2002) 
 Inventing a Nation: Washington, Adams, Jefferson (2003) 
 Imperial America: Reflections on the United States of Amnesia (2004) 
 Point to Point Navigation: A Memoir (2006) 
 The Selected Essays of Gore Vidal (2008) 
 Gore Vidal: Snapshots in History's Glare (2009) 
 I Told You So: Gore Vidal Talks Politics: Interviews with Jon Wiener (2013) 
 Gore Vidal History of the National Security State, The Real News Network, introduction by Paul Jay (2014)
 Buckley vs. Vidal: The Historic 1968 ABC News Debates (2015)

Articles
 "Notes on Television," The Writer, March 1957

Fiction

Novels
 Williwaw (1946) 
 In a Yellow Wood (1947)
 The City and the Pillar (1948) 
 The Season of Comfort (1949) 
 A Search for the King (1950) 
 Dark Green, Bright Red (1950)  (see "In the Lair of the Octopus" and Dreaming War)
 A Star's Progress (aka Cry Shame!) (1950) as "Katherine Everard"
 The Judgment of Paris (1952) 
 Death in the Fifth Position (1952) under the pseudonym Edgar Box
 Thieves Fall Out (1953) under the pseudonym Cameron Kay
 Death Before Bedtime (1953) under the pseudonym Edgar Box
 Death Likes It Hot (1954) under the pseudonym Edgar Box
 Messiah (1954) 
 A Thirsty Evil (1956) (short stories)
 Julian (1964) 
 Washington, D.C. (1967) 
 Myra Breckinridge (1968) 
 Two Sisters (1970) 
 Burr (1973) 
 Myron (1974) 
 1876 (1976) 
 Kalki (1978) 
 Three by Box: The Complete Mysteries of Edgar Box (1978) 
 Creation (1981) 
 Duluth (1983) 
 Lincoln (1984) 
 Empire (1987) 
 Hollywood (1990) 
 Live From Golgotha (1992) 
 The Smithsonian Institution (1998) 
 The Golden Age (2000) 
 Clouds and Eclipses: The Collected Short Stories (2006) The anthology A Thirsty Evil (1956), with the additional short story "Clouds and Eclipses"

Plays
 Visit to a Small Planet (1957) 
 The Best Man (1960)
 On the March to the Sea (1960–61, 2004)
 Romulus (adapted from Friedrich Dürrenmatt's 1950 play Romulus der Große) (1962)
 Weekend (1968)
 Drawing Room Comedy (1970)
 An Evening with Richard Nixon (1970) 
 On the March to the Sea (2005)

Screenplays and teleplays
 Climax!: A Farewell to Arms (1955); Dr. Jekyll & Mr. Hyde (1955) (TV adaptations)
 The Best of Broadway (1955): TV adaptation of Stage Door
 The Catered Affair (1956)
 I Accuse! (1958)
 The Left Handed Gun (1958)
 The Scapegoat (1959)
 Ben Hur (1959) (uncredited)
 Suddenly, Last Summer (1959)
 The Best Man (1964)
 Is Paris Burning? (1966)
 Last of the Mobile Hot Shots (1970)
 Caligula (1979)
 Dress Gray (1986)
 The Sicilian (1987) (uncredited)
 Billy the Kid (1989)
 Dimenticare Palermo (1989)

References

Bibliographies by writer